Poker game may refer to:

 A game of poker, a type of card game
 Poker Game, a pricing game on The Price Is Right
 "The Poker Game" (How I Met Your Mother), a 2013 episode of How I Met Your Mother
 "The Poker Game" (Married... with Children episode), a 1987 episode of Married... with Children

See also
 Poker (disambiguation)